Alin Ioan Șeroni (born 26 March 1987) is a Romanian professional footballer who plays as a centre back for Liga I side FC Botoșani.

Club career
Șeroni made his Liga I debut playing for ACS Poli Timișoara on 19 July 2013 in a match against Dinamo București.

Honours

Club
Auxerre Lugoj
Divizia C: 2005–06
ACS Recaș
Liga IV – Timiș County: 2009–10
Liga III: 2011–12
ACS Poli Timișoara
Cupa Ligii runner-up: 2016–17

References

External links
 
 

People from Timiș County
People from Lugoj
Living people
1987 births
Romanian footballers
Association football defenders
Liga I players
Liga II players
Liga III players
FC Bihor Oradea players
ACS Poli Timișoara players
FC Viitorul Constanța players
FC Brașov (1936) players
FC Dunărea Călărași players
FC UTA Arad players
FC Botoșani players
Moldovan Super Liga players
Speranța Nisporeni players
Romanian expatriate footballers
Romanian expatriate sportspeople in Moldova
Expatriate footballers in Moldova